is a Japanese footballer currently playing as a right-back for SC Sagamihara from 2023.

Career statistics

Club
.

Notes

References

1998 births
Living people
Sportspeople from Ibaraki Prefecture
Association football people from Ibaraki Prefecture
National Institute of Fitness and Sports in Kanoya alumni
Japanese footballers
Association football defenders
Japan Football League players
J3 League players
Tegevajaro Miyazaki players
SC Sagamihara players
21st-century Japanese people